is an open-air museum in Sapporo, Hokkaidō, Japan. It opened in the Nopporo Shinrin Kōen Prefectural Natural Park in 1983. It includes fifty-two historical structures from the "frontier days" of the Meiji period to the Shōwa period that have been relocated and reconstructed or recreated, divided into four zones: town (with thirty-one buildings), fishing village (four buildings), farming village (fourteen buildings), and mountain village (three buildings).

See also
 List of Cultural Properties of Japan - structures (Hokkaidō)
 List of Historic Sites of Japan (Hokkaidō)
 Meiji-mura
 Shikoku Mura
 Hokkaido Museum

References

External links

  Historical Village of Hokkaido
  Historical Village of Hokkaido
  Guide to the 52 structures

Museums in Sapporo
Open-air museums in Japan
History of Hokkaido
Museums established in 1983
1983 establishments in Japan